Šempas ( or ; in older sources also Šenpas) is a village in the Vipava Valley in the Municipality of Nova Gorica in western Slovenia.

Name
The name of the settlement was first attested circa 1200 as in sancto Passo (and as Sand Pass in 1485 and Sannd Pass in 1523). The Slovene name is derived from šent Pas, referring to either Saint Bassus of Lucera or Saint Bassus of Nice, to whom the parish church was formerly dedicated.

Church
The parish church in the settlement is dedicated to Saint Sylvester and belongs to the Diocese of Koper.

References

External links
Šempas on Geopedia

Populated places in the City Municipality of Nova Gorica